Polevoye is a rural locality (a selo) in Novoivanovsky Selsoviet of Ivanovsky District, Amur Oblast, Russia. The population was 82 as of 2018. There are 3 streets.

Geography 
Polevoye is located 49 km north of Ivanovka (the district's administrative centre) by road. Srednebelaya is the nearest rural locality.

References 

Rural localities in Ivanovsky District, Amur Oblast